Martha Foley (March 21, 1897 – September 5, 1977) cofounded Story magazine in 1931 with her husband Whit Burnett. She achieved some celebrity by introducing notable authors through the magazine such as J. D. Salinger, Tennessee Williams and Richard Wright. In 1941 she became the series editor for The Best American Short Stories series.

Childhood
Foley was born in Boston, Massachusetts, on March 21, 1897, to Walter and Margaret M. C. Foley. From 1909 to 1915, she attended Boston Girls' Latin School, and even then aspired to be a writer. The school magazine published her first short story, "Jabberwock," when she was eleven years old.

Her aspirations were present even before this. When she was seven both her parents fell ill, and were unable to care for her. She dealt with this by writing a novel about a fortunate girl who got to go to boarding school. At about this time, she became an avid reader, escaping into fiction. It is surmised that this laid the foundation for her later literary achievements, and when she developed an acute sympathy for the human condition.

After graduating from the 'Girls School' she attended Boston University but did not graduate.

Suffragette and socialist
Foley became active in both the suffrage and socialist movements. She participated in the women's suffrage demonstration that confronted President Woodrow Wilson when he visited Boston on February 24, 1919.

Career and marriage
After leaving Boston University, Foley chose a career as journalist and foreign correspondent for a succession of newspapers. These included the Boston Herald, the San Francisco Record, and the New York Daily News. In 1925, she met her husband-to-be Whit Burnett in San Francisco. In 1927, she joined him in Paris, where she worked for the Paris Herald and wrote fiction. They were married in Vienna in 1930, and their son David was born the following year (he died in 1971). In 1931, she convinced Burnett that they should launch a magazine for short stories only. Before getting married, she was a companion of noted former child prodigy William James Sidis and the object of his unrequited love.

Founding of Story
The objective for the new publication was to publish short stories with merit or quality above the commercial mainstream of American magazines. Believing readers and writers were capable of more created this focus. In a short time their magazine Story became notable. From the first printing, in 1931, of only 167 mimeographed copies comprising the first edition, the magazine was gaining notice. In 1932, after only one year, they and the magazine had moved to New York City and were underwritten by Random House. Moreover, by this time they knew a wide range of the short story writers of the day

The financial backing of Random House created conditions where subscriptions were increased to 25,000, a literary service was offered to readers, and promising new authors were continually introduced. Story is credited with the first publication and early support of a pantheon of notable authors, including: John Cheever, Carson McCullers, William Saroyan, Truman Capote, Norman Mailer, and the three authors mentioned in the introduction, among others.

References

External links 
 

1897 births
1977 deaths
American magazine editors
American women non-fiction writers
Women magazine editors
20th-century American women
American suffragists
American magazine founders